PRVI.TV is a Croatian-language television channel based in Mostar, Bosnia and Herzegovina. The program is mainly produced in Croatian. The TV station was established in 2014. The Croatian word prvi means 'first'.

References

External links 
 Communications Regulatory Agency of Bosnia and Herzegovina

Defunct television channels in Bosnia and Herzegovina
Television channels and stations established in 2014